Rafael Corrales Valverde (born 1957) is a Spanish anarcho-syndicalist.

He was the general secretary of the Confederación Nacional del Trabajo (CNT), the Spanish anarcho-syndicalist labor union, from July 9, 2005 to July 21, 2007. He belongs to the local federation of unions in Seville, so this city was seat of the Permanent Secretary of the National Committee of the CNT during his tenure.

References 
 This article is based on a translation of an article from the Spanish Wikipedia.

External links
  Press release announcing his election

1957 births
Anarcho-syndicalists
Secretaries General of the Confederación Nacional del Trabajo
Living people
Spanish anarchists